The tribe Baphieae is one of the subdivisions of the plant family Fabaceae. The Baphieae tribe arose 55.3 ± 0.4 million years ago (in the early Eocene).

Genera
The Baphieae tribe has been circumscribed to include the following genera, which used to be placed in tribes Sophoreae and Swartzieae:
 Airyantha Brummitt
 Baphia Afzel. ex Lodd. et al.
 Baphiastrum Harms
 Baphiopsis Benth. ex Baker
 Bowringia Champ. ex Benth.
 Dalhousiea Wall. ex Benth.
 Leucomphalos Benth. ex Planch.
This clade does not currently have a node-based, phylogenetic definition. Members of the Baphieae exhibit the following synapomorphies: 
…free stamens and poorly differentiated lower petals, or flowers sometimes appearing radially symmetrical,…simple or unifoliolate leaves, anthers more or less basifixed, and the calyx splitting to the base either down one side only and so appearing spathaceous, or down both sides and so becoming bilabiate.

References

 
Fabaceae tribes